Elbeyli is a village in Mut district of Mersin Province, Turkey. It is situated to the west of Turkish state highway . The population of the village was 438 as of 2012.

References

Villages in Mut District